Niall Gilligan (born 12 August 1976) is an Irish hurler who usually played as a right corner-forward for the Clare senior team.

Born in Sixmilebridge, County Clare, Gilligan first played competitive hurling whilst at school in St. Flannan's College. He arrived on the inter-county scene when he first linked up with the Clare under-21 team. He made his senior debut in the 1997 championship. Gilligan went on to play a key part for Clare for fourteen seasons, and won one All-Ireland medal and two Munster medals.  He was an All-Ireland runner-up on one occasion.

As a member of the Munster inter-provincial team on a number of occasions, Gilligan won four Railway Cup medals. At club level he won one All-Ireland medal, one Munster medal and three championship medals with Sixmilebridge.

Gilligan's career tally of 20 goals and 197 points marks him out as Clare's top championship scorer.

Throughout his career Gilligan made 56 championship appearances, marking him out as Clare's most "capped" player of all-time. He announced his retirement from inter-county hurling on 5 January 2010.

Even during his playing days Gilligan became involved in team management and coaching. He has been a selector with the Sixmilebridge senior, under-21 and under-15 teams, while he was manager of the Sixmilebridge under-21 team that claimed championship honours in 2013.

Gilligan retired from hurling on 3 November 2019, as Sixmilebridge were defeated by Ballygunner in the 2019 Munster Senior Club Hurling Championship.

Playing career

Club
Gilligan plays for Sixmilebridge. He helped the club to an All Ireland Club title in 1996, where he appeared as a substitute.  He won further Clare titles in 2000 and 2002, and a Munster Senior Club Hurling title in 2002. In 2013 after and 11-year gap he added a 4th title to his collection. In 2015, he won his 5th county title after a 1-21 to 0-15 win against Clonlara in the final.

Inter-county
Gilligan made his debut for Clare in 1997, helping Clare to their 3rd All Ireland title.  He won another Munster medal in 1998, and contested the Munster final in 1999 and 2008.  He also won an All Star in 1999.  In January 2010, Gilligan announced his retirement from inter-county hurling.

In 2011, Gillgan played with the Clare Intermediate team in the Munster Intermediate Hurling Championship where he scored 1-5 against Cork in the semi-final. He later helped Clare to their first ever Munster title when they beat Limerick in the final. In the semi final Clare overcame Galway helped by 0-08 from Gilligan. They went on to win a first All-Ireland Intermediate Hurling Championship when they beat Kilkenny in the final, he scored 0-03 in the game.

Career statistics

Honours

Clare
All-Ireland Senior Hurling Championship (1) : 1997
Munster Senior Hurling Championship (2) : 1997, 1998
Munster Intermediate Hurling Championship (1) : 2011
All-Ireland Intermediate Hurling Championship (1) : 2011

Interprocincial
Interprovincial Championship (3): 1997, 2005, 2007

Sixmilebridge
Clare Senior Hurling Championship (7) : 1995, 2000, 2002, 2013, 2015, 2017, 2019
Munster Senior Club Championship (2) : 1995, 2000
All-Ireland Senior Club Hurling Championship (1) ; 1996
Clare County Hurling Leagues (4): 2000, 2004, 2010, 2013

Individual
Awards
All-Star Award (1) : 1999

References

1976 births
Living people
Sixmilebridge hurlers
Clare inter-county hurlers
Munster inter-provincial hurlers
All-Ireland Senior Hurling Championship winners
Hurling managers
Hurling selectors